A radial scar, formally radial scar of the breast, is a benign  breast lesion that can radiologically mimic malignancy, i.e. cancer.

Radial scar is associated with atypia and/or malignancy and may be an independent risk factor for the development of carcinoma in either breast.

Diagnosis
Radial scars are diagnosed by a microscopic examination of excised tissue, i.e. they are diagnosed by pathologists based on their histomorphology.

Histomorphology

Radial scars are spiculated masses characterized microscopically by a sclerotic appearing (i.e. scar like) center with peripheral entrapped normal breast ducts and lobules.

Management
The presence of a radial scar on imaging mandates a percutaneous core biopsy for histologic diagnosis.  Excisional biopsy is usually recommended for radial scar, although it has been argued that core biopsy evaluation and surveillance may be appropriate in selected patients.

See also
Breast cancer

References

External links 

Radial Scar: How worried should we be about this rare breast abnormality? (telegraph.co.uk)
Micrograph of a radial scar (breastpathology.info)

Breast
Scarring